The United Liberation Front of Asom (ULFA) is an armed separatist organisation operating in the Northeast Indian state of Assam. It seeks to establish an independent sovereign nation state of Assam for the indigenous Assamese people through an armed struggle in the Assam conflict. The Government of India banned the organisation in 1990 citing it as a terrorist organisation, while the United States Department of State lists it under "other groups of concern."

According to ULFA sources, it was founded on 7 April 1979 at Rang Ghar and began operations in 1990. Sunil Nath, former Central Publicity Secretary and spokesman of ULFA has stated that the organisation established ties with the Nationalist Socialist Council of Nagaland in 1983 and with the Burma based Kachin Independent Army in 1987. Military operations against the ULFA by the Indian Army began in 1990 and continue into the present. On 5 December 2009, the chairman and the deputy commander-in-chief of ULFA was taken into Indian custody. In 2011, there was a major crackdown on the ULFA in Bangladesh, which greatly assisted the government of India in bringing ULFA leaders to talks. In January 2010, ULFA softened its stance and dropped demands for independence as a condition for talks with the Government of India.

On 3 September 2011, a tripartite agreement for "Suspension of Operations" against ULFA was signed between the Indian government, the Assam government and the ULFA.

History
The ULFA was founded on 7 April 1979 in Sivasagar, Assam by a group of young men that included Paresh Baruah, Arabinda Rajkhowa, Anup Chetia, Pradip Gogoi, Bhadreshwar Gohain, and Budheswar Gogoi. The organisation's purpose was to engage in an armed struggle to form a separate independent state of Assam.

During its heyday (the late 80s and 90s), it enjoyed popularity among many of the indigenous Assamese people of the Brahmaputra valley. The majority of the supporters felt that a powerful organisation was necessary to get the voice of a peripheral region heard in the corridors of power in Lutyen's Delhi. But gradually, the organisation's emphasis on extortion and smuggling of weapons in the name of furthering the ‘revolution’ led to mindless violence throughout the state. It witnessed a period marked by growing disillusionment and anger amid supporters. In their bloody conflict with the security forces, many innocent civilians were killed and several thousand were permanently maimed. It is estimated that more than 10 thousand local youths perished during that turbulent period. In the process, owing to the twin factors of increasing operations by the security forces and dwindling support among its core sympathisers, ULFA's importance in Assam has been declined drastically.

Recruiting for the front did not begin until 1983. Soon after it finished recruitment in 1984, it began to seek out training and arms procurement from other groups such as the Kachin Independence Army (KIA) and the Nationalist Socialist Council of Nagaland (NSCN). In 1986 it launched a fundraising "campaign" across India by way of extortion. It then began to set up camps in Tinsukia and Dibrugarh but was soon declared a terrorist organization by the government on 7 November, under the Unlawful Activities (Prevention) Act.

In less than a decade of its formation, the ULFA emerged as one of the most powerful and violent insurgent outfit in Southeast Asia, largely because of the immense popularity it enjoyed during the first decade of its struggle as well as its economic power which in turn helped it in bolstering its military capabilities. In the early 1990s, ULFA launched an aggressive campaign with victims such as security forces, political opponents, and blasting rail links. In July 1991 the front captured and held 14 people for ransom, included in the abductees was an engineer and a national of the Soviet Union. From the 1990s on the ULFA have continued to carry out attacks.

Till the late 2000s, it maintained a number of camps in Bangladesh, where members are trained and sheltered away from Indian security forces. In April 2004, Bangladesh police and Coast Guard intercepted massive amounts of illegal arms and ammunition, at Chittagong, being loaded into 10 trucks and intended for ULFA. A total of 50 were charged with arms smuggling and arms offenses, including former high-level Bangladesh political appointees including Bangladesh National Party ministers and National Security Intelligence military officers, as well as prominent businessmen, and Paresh Baruah, military wing chief of ULFA who was then living in Dhaka. He fled the country. Trials were still underway in Chittagong in 2012 under tight security.

They had also maintained camps in Bhutan, which were destroyed by the Royal Bhutan Army aided by the Special Frontier Force in December 2003. These camps housed combatants and non-combatant families of ULFA members.

ULFA maintained close relationships with other separatist organisations like NDFB, KLO and NSCN (Khaplang).

In 2008, News Services reported citing Indian police and intelligence officials reported ULFA's commander-in-chief Paresh Baruah had taken refuge in Yunnan Province of China, along China-Myanmar border, due to continuous defeat of his Organization. The report also stated that a small batch of militants had also taken refuge along with him. Paresh Baruah had previously visited China in the 1980s. In December 2003, China spurned ULFA's chairman Arabinda Rajkhowa appeal to provide safe passage to the rebels from Bhutan.

Secret killings of Militants family members

During the government of AGP leader Prafulla Kumar Mahanta, as a part of his government's counter-insurgency strategy, unidentified gunmen had assassinated a number of family members of ULFA leaders. With the fall of this government following elections in 2001, the secret killings stopped. Dinesh Barua, the elder brother of Paresh Barua, was taken from his house at night by unidentified Assamese men, Later his body was found lying near a cremation center in Chabua. ULFA's self-styled Publicity Secretary, Mithinga Daimary, also had his five family members killed during this period.

Government investigations into the killings culminated in the report of the "Saikia Commission", presented to the Assam Assembly on 15 November 2007. The report describes how the killings were organised by Prafulla Mahanta, then the Assam Home Minister. They were executed by the police. The gunmen were former members of ULFA who had surrendered to the government. They approached their targets at home, at night, knocking on the door and speaking in Assamese to allay suspicion. When the victims answered the door, they were shot or kidnapped to be shot elsewhere.

Organizational structure

During the 1990s and 2000s, the total strength of ULFA was stated to be around 3,000, while various other sources put the figure ranging from 4,000 to 6,000. A military wing of the ULFA, the Sanjukta Mukti Fouj (SMF) was formed on 16 March 1996.

SMF had formed three full-fledged so-called battalions: the 7th, 28th, and the 709th. While remaining battalions exist only on paper at best they have the strengths of a company or so. Their allocated spheres of operation are as follows:

7th Bn (HQ-Sukhini) is responsible for defence of General Headquarters (GHQ).
8th Bn - Nagaon, Morigaon, Karbi Anglong
9th Bn - Golaghat, Jorhat, Sivasagar
11th Bn - Kamrup, Nalbari
27th Bn - Barpeta, Bongaigaon, Kokrajhar  
28th Bn - Tinsukia, Dibrugarh 
709th Bn - Kalikhola

Command Structure

Enigma Force

Enigma Force or Enigma Group was an exclusive and near autonomous striking group of the ULFA. It is known to a few top leaders of the outfit and the cadres were isolated from the others. It was designed for hit and run type of operations. It was headed by the Raju Baruah.

Activities

Assassinations
On 29 July 1990, the Superintendent of Police (SP) of the Dibrugarh district Daulat Singh Negi (IPS) and his PSO and driver were killed by an ambush in Lahoal of Dibrugarh district by the ULFA.

Some of the major assassinations by ULFA include that of Surendra Paul in May 1990, the brother of businessman Lord Swraj Paul, that precipitated a situation leading to the sacking of the Government of Assam under Prafulla Kumar Mahanta and the beginning of Operation Bajrang.

On the ULFA's Army Day on 16 March 2003, an IED explosion under a bus on National Highway No. 7 killed six civilians and wounded approximately 55 others.

In 1991 a Russian engineer, and national of the Soviet Union was kidnapped along with others and killed. In 1997, Sanjay Ghose, a social activist and a relative of a high ranking Indian diplomat, was kidnapped and killed. The highest government officer assassinated by the group was local Asom Gana Parishad minister Nagen Sarma in 2000. An unsuccessful assassination attempt was made on AGP Chief Minister Prafulla Kumar Mahanta in 1997. A mass grave, discovered at a destroyed ULFA camp in Lakhipathar forest, showed evidence of executions committed by ULFA.

In 2003, the ULFA was accused of killing labourers from Bihar in response to an alleged molestation of a Mizo girl in a train passing through Bihar. This incident sparked off anti-Bihari sentiment in Assam and ULFA saw it as an opportunity to regain its lost ground. The ULFA killed civilians of Bihari origin and other outsiders of mainland India.

In 2003, during a Railways Recruitment Board Examination for Group (D) posts conducted by Northeast Frontier Railway zone a wing of Indian Railways, a good number of candidates from Bihar and other states were beaten up and stopped from taking the exam by some elements who were seeking 100 percent reservations for unemployed indigenous Assamese people in the said test.

In resentment, conflicts arose with train passengers from North Eastern Indians states passing through some of the stations like Katihar, Jamalpur, Kishanganj in Bihar.

During that period ULFA was already losing its popularity and ground across many pockets in Assam where it had strongholds. However, ULFA took this situation as an opportunity to fan an opposition against 'India' among people in Assam. They started killing Hindi-speaking people mostly having origin in Bihar in the State.

On 15 August 2004, an explosion occurred in Dhemaji District of Assam in which 13 people died, mainly women and school children. This explosion was carried out by ULFA. The ULFA has obliquely accepted responsibility for the blast. This appears to be the first instance of ULFA admitting to public killings with an incendiary device.

In January 2007, the ULFA once again struck in Assam killing approximately 62 Hindi-speaking migrant workers mostly from Bihar. ULFA notoriety as a directionless and unpopular organisation increased, as the bomb blast victims also included several indigenous Assamese people.

The Central Government made a tough response, forcing a dreaded group of ULFA - 28 Battalion to unilaterally bow down and seek asylum from the government. This particular one-sided ceasefire broke the backbone of ULFA.

On 15 March 2007, ULFA triggered a blast in Guwahati, injuring six persons as it celebrated its 'army day'.

Economic subversion
The ULFA has claimed responsibility for bombings of economic targets like crude oil pipelines, freight trains and government buildings, including 7 August 2005 attack on oil pipelines in Assam. ULFA carried out a bombing and destruction of a five million-liter petrol reservoir at Digboi refinery in Tinsukia, with an estimated property loss of Rs 200million. On the same day they also damaged a gas pipeline in the oil district of Tinsukia.

Recruitment
In the initial years of the ULFA movement (when it used to enjoy widespread public support in both urban and rural areas of Assam among the indigenous Assamese people), cadres were recruited from rural areas as well as from many towns in Lower Assam, Northern and Upper Assam and middle Assam districts. One of the most popular ULFA leader of all time, the late Heerak Jyoti Mahanta hailed from a place which is just a few kilometres from Guwahati. However, with the elite upper caste Assamese urban middle class becoming increasingly sceptical of ULFA's method of functioning, the ULFA targeted the remote villages and the predominantly backward areas of predominantly marginalised indigenous communities for recruitment. According to intelligence sources, the Paresh Baruah faction of the Ulfa, which have been continuously raising its voice against the ongoing peace process being initiated by the Arabinda Rajkhowa faction, is engaged in a massive recruitment drive in the rural areas of Dibrugarh, Tinsukia, Sivasagar, Lakhimpur and Nalbari districts of Assam. The Ulfa also has strong following among the Naga people in Assam.

Political activities
After 1985 and before it was banned in 1990, ULFA was credited in the media with many public activities. It has continued a public discourse of sorts through the local media (newspapers), occasionally publishing its position on political issues centred around the nationality question. It has participated in public debates with public figures from Assam. During the last two local elections, the ULFA had called for boycotts. Media reports suggest that it used its forces to intimidate activists and supporters of the then-ruling parties (Congress and AGP respectively).

Extortion
The ULFA is credited with some bank robberies during its initial stages. Now it is widely reported to extort businessmen, bureaucrats and politicians for collecting funds. In 1997, the Chief Minister of Assam accused Tata Tea of paying the medical bills of the ULFA cultural secretary Pranati Deka at a Mumbai hospital.

Other criminal activities
The ULFA is involved in other organised criminal activities such as drug trafficking.

Peace Negotiations and Surrenders

Beginning in 1990, the Government of India has attempted to wean away members of the ULFA. This occurred due to the death of the ULFA's deputy Commander in chief Heerak Jyoti Mahanta on 31 December 1991. He had opposed surrenders, but they began after his death. The group has been meeting more local opposition as residents are tired of the violence and disruption, and some energy has gone out of the movement.

In 1992 a large section of second-rung leaders and members surrendered to government authorities. These former members were allowed to retain their weapons to defend against their former colleagues; they were offered bank loans without any liabilities to help them re-integrate into society. This loose group, now called SULFA, has become an important element in the armed politics and business of Assam.

The total number of ULFA militants to have laid down arms has gone up to 8,718. 4,993 cadres surrendered between 1991 and 1998. 3,435 surrendered between 1998 and 2005, when a new policy to deal with the ULFA was unveiled. On 24 January 2012, one of northeast India's biggest surrender ceremonies took place in Assam's main city of Guwahati, when a total of 676 militants laid down their weapons. In 2020, 1,675 militants of ULFA(I) and allied militant groups surrendered.

In 2003, ULFA had put forward a set of three preconditions for talks and negotiations with the Indian government. Thought government had rejected these preconditions. The preconditions were:

 The talks should be held in a third country.
 The talks should be held under United Nations supervision.
 The agenda of the talks should include the independence of Assam.

In 2004, the ULFA dropped the first two preconditions and offered to talk with the government. The Government of India was not ready to negotiate on the issue of Independence. Still some progress was made when the ULFA formed a "People's Consultative Group" in September 2005 to prepare the grounds for an eventual negotiation between the government and ULFA, which the government has welcomed. In a sustained operation launched by Indian Army inside a National Park in Dibru Saikhowa, ULFA lost its hides and camps, important leaders and cadres. The group came to the negotiating table in 2005.
According to the India Times, talks were first held in December 2005 at the residence of the Prime Minister, Manmohan Singh.
There were three rounds of peace talks with the 11-member People's Consultative Group (PCG), headed by noted Assamese writer Indira Goswami, leading to a temporary truce in August 2006. However the truce broke down by 23 September of the same year as ULFA continued with its violent activities against civil population mainly tea estates and oil pipelines. It also violated ceasefire as it lobbed grenades on Army columns during the ceasefire period.

On 24 June 2008, some leaders and cadres of the A and C companies of ULFA declared unilateral ceasefire at a press meet held at Amarpur in Tinsukia district. They declared the ceasefire to pressure the top brass of ULFA to sit on negotiation table with the Government of India. But the top brass of ULFA expelled the leaders of 28 Battalion led by Mrinal Hazarika and Jiten Dutta (who had managed to escape from the cordon of Indian Army in Dibru Saikhowa National Park). The group later renamed as ULFA ( Pro-talk).

Lt Bijoy Chinese alias Bijoy Das, Commander of 28th Battalion also surrendered to state authorities in 2013.

Between 2009 and 2018, entire leadership of ULFA was either Captured or surrendered to the government thus leading to disbanding of the all ULFA battalions, besides only part of 27th battalion renamed as Kapili Gut remained. Currently, there are no commanders other than Paresh Baruah. All the others have been downgraded to staff and workers.

Links to China
The leftover faction of ULFA has allegedly been using China for shelter following expulsion from both Burma and Bangladesh.

See also
Operation Bajrang
Insurgency in Northeast India
People's Consultative Group
Sanjukta Mukti Fouj
List of terrorist organisations in India
Secret killings of Assam
List of top ULFA leaders

References

Footnotes

External links
ULFA Archived home page
Bloody Tea - Program on Aljazeera telecast beginning 30 May 2007. On YouTube: Part 1, Part 2. Retrieved 2007-12-29.
 ULFA - Terrorist Group from Assam from South Asia Terrorism Portal
 Assam at GlobalSecurity.org
Report on the most recent ULFA attack on poor migrant workers, January 2007
"ULFA cadres went to Pak via Bangla for training in explosives, say Assam cops" - article in Yahoo! India News dated 15 June 2006
"Media gag must go, journalists tell ULFA" - article in Yahoo! India News dated 15 June 2006
"'Respect right to freedom of expression':Media to ULFA" - article in Yahoo! India News dated 15 June 2006
"Assam on Red Alert following fresh ULFA strike" - article in Yahoo! India News dated 12 June 2006
"Market blast kills at least 4 in Indian northeast" - article in Yahoo! India News dated 12 June 2006
"Bomb kills 10 at India Independence Parade" - article in New York Times dated 15 August 2004
Assam: How Ulfa terrorism altered demographic pattern dated 15 August 2012
sandhikhyan - The e-Magazine of ULFA (Protalk)
Wayback Machine

Banned socialist parties
Politics of Assam
Organisations based in Assam
Organisations designated as terrorist by India
Organizations based in Asia designated as terrorist
Terrorism in Assam
Assamese nationalism
Left-wing militant groups in India
National liberation movements
Sivasagar
1979 establishments in Assam